Metal Tornado is a 2011 science fiction, thriller television movie directed by Gordon Yang and starring Lou Diamond Phillips. The film was generally poorly received.

Synopsis 

Helios World in Chester County, Pennsylvania design a system created by ex-employee Stephen Winters that can convert solar flares into electricity.  After some testing he finds a flaw in his design that causes magnetic energy to escape, he phones CEO Jonathan Kane to alert him but ignores his warnings. It produces a stronger magnetic field which causes metal to be attracted to it and he is killed in the process.

They run a test using the design from an array of satellites which converts solar flares into a magnetic beam which is directed towards their power station.  It is successful and stores it, but it forms a temporary magnetic field that sets off car alarms, but don't think it was an issue. They celebrate their success, and the scientists believe it was completely contained. Jonathan plans a test at their facility in France.

Allysa Winters, Stephen Winters' wife, is interviewed by investigators about her husband's death. She looks into his work and what happened.

Nearby, a lumberjack is cutting trees with a chainsaw when it rises off the ground and flies off.  In another scene, a man is riding and stops his motorcross bike, but it flies into a magnetic energy vortex which expands.

Michael Edwards, notices that 2% of the magnetic energy gathered had been lost. He reports it to Greg urging him that more testing has to done but isn't concerned. Meanwhile, Michael's son Nick Edwards is writing a paper about the power system and is interested in the power loss. Allysa Winters phones Helios and tries to warn them that it's dangerous.

15 miles away, Stan, a gas station owner sees the vortex (now resembling a tornado) and his glasses are pulled into it.  The vortex also starts to damage property.  The sheriff Joe Riley investigates the phenomenon and contacts Michael to voice his concerns. Michael and Rebecca arrive to examine it further. They notice that their watches had stopped and their compass is spinning.  Rebecca walks with it to see how far the field goes and where it is heading.  Michael surmises that the power loss may have created it.

Michael heads to Helios to tell Greg and Jonathan about his theory but neither believe him. He contacts Ron for help. Michael, the sheriff, Ron and Nick meet at a hospital to talk about two farmers who were injured from it.

Michael, Nick and Rebecca hack into the Helios security footage to get the proof they need and show it to Greg to urge him to delay the other test but it goes ahead.

Michael meets Allysa Winters about the flaw and tells him about a potential energy leak and hands the documentation over. He gives it to Greg, who reports it to Jonathan.

Ron figures out that the tornado is following veins of Iron ore and is heading towards Henderson. He tells Rebecca, Michael, and the sheriff to evacuate. Michael contacts Greg and Jonathan telling them that it's heading towards the town. Soon after, he loses phone signal. He sees the tornado and quickly gets out of his car, which is pulled into it. He hides under a bridge and helps a lady on a motorbike as it falls on top of her, breaking her arm.

In Henderson, Rebecca and Nick get caught in their car by it and hide in a nearby church basement. It collapses and Nick saves Rebecca from falling debris, but fractures his leg in the process.

Michael contacts Ron and finds out it is heading towards Philadelphia. He meets Greg and Jonathan at Helios to find a way to stop it. He thinks an EMP bomb may disrupt it, and they contact The Pentagon to arrange two drones to drop them.

The other team reports that a similar tornado is heading towards Paris, and tries to stop it with an EMP bomb as well. But it reaches the city before the drones do and destroys most of it, including the Eiffel Tower.

Two drones head towards Philadelphia, but one fails. The other one launches the bomb successfully, dissipating the magnetic field and stopping the tornado. Greg reports that the second tornado was stopped in Paris.

Michael, Rebecca, Nick and Ron have a meal. In the background, the news reports Jonathan had accepted responsibility and resigned.

Cast
 Lou Diamond Phillips as Michael Edwards, a scientist at Helios World
 Nicole de Boer as Rebecca, a scientist at Helios World and Michael's partner
 Greg Evigan as Jonathan Kane, the CEO of Helios World 
 Stephen MacDonald as Nick Edwards, a student and Michael's Son
 John MacLaren as Ron, a teacher
 Sophie Gendron as Allysa Winters, Stephen Winter's Wife 
 Frank Schorpion as Greg, Chief scientist at Helios World 
 Sean Tucker as Joe Riley, Sheriff
 Robert Reynolds as Stan Brooks, Gas station owner 
 Todd Duckworth as Stephen Winters, an ex-employee at Helios World

Reception
The film received generally poor or very poor reviews. The score card website gave the film 4/10. Crave Online gave it 1.5/10. Disaster Movie gave it 2/5. Starburst gave the film 2/10. BZ Film gave it 4/10 and Radio Times gave it 2/5.

References

External links
 
  BBFC website

2011 television films
2011 films
2010s science fiction thriller films
2010s disaster films
Films set in Philadelphia
Films set in Pennsylvania
Films set in Paris
Films shot in Ottawa
2010s English-language films